State Trunk Highway 101 (often called Highway 101, STH-101 or WIS 101) is a state highway in the U.S. state of Wisconsin. It runs south–north in northeast Wisconsin from US 8 in Armstrong Creek to WIS 70, US 2 and US 141 in Florence. WIS 101 meets WIS 70 near Keyes Lake, and the two highways run concurrently for  until their shared terminus. The highway also serves the community of Fence and the areas surrounding the Pine and Popple rivers. WIS 101 is maintained by the Wisconsin Department of Transportation.

Route description

WIS 101 begins at a junction with US 8 in Armstrong Creek in eastern Forest County. The highway heads north through the Town of Armstrong Creek, intersecting County Highway F near three lakes. From here the route crosses into Florence County, where it meets County Highway C west of the community of Fence. It continues northward through the forested Town of Fence, crossing the Popple River near a wayside. Past the river, the highway enters the Town of Fern. After running through the community of Fern, the route turns to the east near Price Lake. It turns northward again to pass through a forested area with many lakes, intersecting County Highway D in this area. After passing a county park by Keyes Lake, WIS 101 intersects WIS 70 in the Town of Commonwealth, and the two highways head eastward concurrently. The routes turn northeast into the Town of Florence, where they both terminate at US 2 and US 141 in western Florence.

Major intersections

See also

References

External links

101
Transportation in Forest County, Wisconsin
Transportation in Florence County, Wisconsin